Ata Sanayi station is a railway station in Çiğli, İzmir. The station serves the Northern Line of the İZBAN commuter rail system.

References 

Railway stations in İzmir Province
Railway stations opened in 1876
Railway stations opened in 2011
2011 establishments in Turkey
Çiğli District